Ángel Alexander Ledesma Félix (born June 22, 1993) is an Ecuadorian footballer who plays for Manta F.C. He made his professional debut while playing for Macará in 2010.

External links
Ledesma's FEF player card 

1993 births
Living people
People from Quevedo, Ecuador
Association football midfielders
Ecuadorian footballers
C.S.D. Macará footballers
L.D.U. Quito footballers
S.D. Aucas footballers